†Bourgetia is an extinct genus of fossil sea snails, marine gastropod mollusks in the family Pseudomelaniidae.

Species
Species within the genus Bourgetia include:

 Bourgetia saemanni (Oppel, 1856) - synonyms: Melania striata Sowerby; Phasianella striata Sowerby; Phasianella sämanni Oppel; Bourgetia striata Sowerby

References

External links

Pseudomelaniidae